Scapulars are devotional objects in Christian worship. Black Scapular may refer to:

Black Scapular of the Passion
Scapular of the Seven Sorrows of Mary

See also
Scapular of Saint Michael the Archangel, a scapular that is both blue and black.